David Louie may refer to:

 David M. Louie (born 1951), Attorney General of Hawaii in the administration of Hawaii Governor Neil Abercrombie
 David Wong Louie (1954–2018), American writer
 David Louie (racing driver) (born 1962), racecar driver from Hong Kong